Citizens Party: School – Health Care – Care is a local political party in Hultsfred, Sweden. The party is led by Göran Berglund. The party was founded in 1998.

M:svo has been accused of racism.

In the 2002 municipal elections M:svo got 324 votes (3.6%), and two seats (Göran Berglund and Gert Schuld).

External links
Party website 
Contact info for M:svo councilors and replacers

Swedish local political parties